David Emerson (born 10 March 1961) is an Australian former cricketer. He played 16 first-class cricket matches for Victoria between 1983 and 1995.

See also
 List of Victoria first-class cricketers

References

External links
 

1961 births
Living people
Australian cricketers
Victoria cricketers
Cricketers from Melbourne